Grupo Yndio is a Mexican band from Sonora founded in 1972, by some of the members of the dissolute Los Pulpos.

The band is known for Spanish covers of English-language pop hits, but with a distinctive Grupero style. Their best known hits include "Melodía desencadenada", "Línea telefónica" and "Herida de amor," Spanish covers of "Unchained Melody" by The Righteous Brothers, "Telephone Line" by Electric Light Orchestra (ELO) and "Love Hurts" by Nazareth respectively.

They had two number-one hits in Mexico: 
Their cover of "Él" was #1 for 4 weeks in 1973, alongside the original version by Los Strwck.
Their Spanish-language cover of "We Said Goodbye" (titled "¿Por qué nos dijimos adiós?") in 1975, alongside the original version by Dave Maclean.

Discography
Éxitos Eternos 
Sin Tu Amor (EP-1972)
1 Sin Tu Amor
2 Mamá Gorda
3 Las Nubes Que Pasan (Díselo Tú)
4 Amor de Padres
Sin Tu Amor (1972)
1. Sin Tu Amor
2. No Me Dejes Amor
3. El Tiempo
4. Lo Que Te Puedo Ofrecer
5. Noches y Días Perdidos
6. Si Tu Me Dejas
7. Es Para Tí, Es Para Mí
8. Lo Que Siempre He Soñado
9. Jamás Corazón
10. Siempre Habra un Mañana
Yndio MPHS-6114(1975)
1. El
2. Cuando Salgo A los Campos
3. Quedamos Como Amigos
4. Las Nubes
5. Desolacion
6. Dulce Amor
7. Siempre De Novios
8. Como Te Extraño
9. Perdoname Mi Amor
10. Dejame
11. Sufro Tu Ausencia
Por que Nos Dijimos Adios MPHS-6125 (1975)
1. Por Que Nos Dijimos Adios
2. Como Te Extraño
3. La Que Era Ya No Es
4. Cuando Salgo A los Campos
5. Perdoname Mi Amor
6. Dejame
7. Quedamos Como Amigos
8. Sufro Tu Ausencia
9. Las Nubes
10. Desolacion
V Aniversario (1977)
1. Eres Mi Mundo (You're My World)
2. Amanecer
3. Me Haces Falta... Te Necesito
4. Ya Nunca Más
5. Linea Telefónica (Telephone Line)
6. Solos los Dos
7. Entonces Me Dices Adiós
8. Por Culpa de los Dos
9. Gracias Amor
10. Abrázame, Decídete
Herida de Amor (1978)
1. Herida de Amor
2. Mi Gran Tristeza
3. Adiós Amor
4. Cuéntale
5. Dame un Beso y Dime Adiós
6. Por Qué Te Quiero
7. Llorar, Llorar, Llorar
8. Ven a Mí
9. Nunca te Olvidaré
10. Te lo Pido de Rodillas
Cartas Marcadas (1980)
1. No Nos Habalmos Más
2. Adiós Amor
3. Toda la Noche Contigo
4. Cartas Marcadas
5. Cuando Más Te Necesite
6. Sueños Locos
7. Déjame Ver
8. Desde Que Te Perdí
9. La Traicionera
10. Te Necesite
Ayudame (1981)
1. Ayudame
2. Elvira
3. Mujer (Woman)
4. Sencillamente una Canción
5. Vuélveme a Querer
6. Amor Agotado
7. Delirio
8. Ana
9. Al Qué Tu Amas
10. Si Me Dices Que Te Vas
10 Aniversario (1982)
1. Algo
2. No Debes Verme Llorar
3. Soñando
4. Ya No Voy A Llorar
5. Amor
6. Mejor Que Ayer
7. Linda Mujer
8. Brindo Por Ella
9. Como Puedes
10. Creo En Ti
Temas de Amor (1983)
1. Amor Indio
2. Gema
3. Solo
4. Historia De Un Amor
5. Ojos Cafes
6. Cancionero
7. Cien Mujeres
8. Sin Ti
9. Loca Pasion
10. Noche Callada
Polkas y Cumbias (1984)
1 Pazcola
2 Siempre Hace Frío
3 Los Pandeados
4 La Huerfanita
5 Este Amor
6 La Rufalina
7 El Porro de Pedrito
8 Sonora Querida
9 María Chuchena
10 No Volveré
Adiós (1985)
1. Adiós
2. Corazón
3. Música Triste
4. Eres Tú
5. Ladrones
6. Te Quedas o Te Vas
7. Una Limosina de Amor
8. No Quiero Vivir Sin Ti
9. Desde Hoy
10. Secreto Amor
11. Cuando el Amor Se Acaba
12. Antes de Que Te Vayas
Polkas y Cumbias Vol II (1986)
1 El gringuito
2 Cuatro caminos
3 Mi corazón
4 Mariposa equivocada
5 Bésame, bésame
6 La indita y el yndio
7 Uno más de los mojados
8 Es amor
9 Lamento del mojado
10 Todo terminó
Cada Vez Que Tú Te Vas (1986)
1. Cada Vez Que Tú Te Vas
2. Hasta Que a Mi Regresas
3. Que Pena
4. Lo Dices Tú o Lo Digo Yo (Say You, Say Me)
5. Solo un Beso
6. Cherish
7. Eso Fue Ayer
8. Grande Tan Grande
9. Muñequita
10. Bien Hecho Amor
La Cancion De Los Dos (1987)
1. La Cancion De Los Dos
2. Sin Ella
3. Yo Preferiria
4. Lo Importante Es Soñar
5. A Donde Vas Amor?
6. Mi Vida Se Pinto De Gris
7. Despecho
8. Pobre De Mi Corazon
9. Reina Y Soñador
10. Cariño Mio
Yndio (1988)
1. No Quiero Vivir Ya Sin Tu Amor
2. Nos Pertenecemos
3. Revisa Mi Equipaje
4. Yo Comence La Broma
5. Mala Cabeza
6. Llorar
7. Y Me Fui
8. Fijate
9. Al Final
10. El Sabor De Mi Piel
Triste Realidad (1990)
1. Cariño Bandolero
2. Red Wine
3. Triste Realidad
4. Por Que Dios Mio
5. Reflections Of My Life
6. El Secreto
7. Como Da Vueltas La Vida
8. No Me Vayas A Olvidar
9. Dos Seres
10 Just Because\
Tiernamente Desencadenado (1991)
1. Melodía Desencadenada (Unchained Melody).
2. Aprendiendo a Vivir Sin Tí.
3. Nuestro Amor Prohibido - Mi Adoración.
4. Oh! Niña (Oh! Girl!).
5. De Rodillas Ante Tí.
6. Déjame Decirte.
7. Quisiera.
8. Que Triste Es Decir Adiós.
9. Desde Que Se Fué.
10. Entre la Lluvia y Mi Llorar (Between Rain and My Cry)
Si Quieres Volver (1992)
1 Si quieres volver
2 Siempre en mi mente
3 Tus mentiras
4 Ojos claros
5 El fin del mundo
6 Hasta entonces
7 Angel baby
8 Juanito galán
9 Quiéreme esta noche
10 Para qué
Lo Quieras O No (1994)
1 Te lo pido de rodillas
2 Desde que te perdí
3 Lo quieras o no
4 Libre, solterito y sin nadie
5 No puedo evitar enamorarme de ti
6 Muchas veces reí
7 Al sur de la frontera
8 Sólo
9 Ahora veo claramente
10 Vivir en soledad
11 Embrujo
12 No esperes que sea tu amigo
13 Demasiado romántica
14 Al sur de la frontera (versión inglés)
15 Sólo (versión larga) [bonus track]
Reencuentro (1996)
1 Te amo necesariamente
2 Sueña, dulce nena
3 Ámame
4 Eres tú
5 Tus ojos de amor
6 Te quiero
7 Cómo ayudar a un corazón roto
8 Si te vas
9 Sólo por ti
10 Acaríciame
11 La última carta
12 Dulce amor
13 Larga distancia
14 Huellas
12 Éxitos Rancheros y Cumbias (1998)
1 Te He Prometido
2 Amor de los Dos
3 Mi Recuerdo
4 El duelo
5 Tequila
6 El Mandilón
7 En Unos Días
8 Calacas
9 Aquella que se Mira
10 La Gorda Pac-Man
11 Borracho
12 Fíjate
El León Despertó (1998)
1 Tatuaje
2 
3 Ya te olvidé
4 No quiero perder tu amor
5 Pirata de amor
6 Te necesito
7 Pensando en essa chica
8 Lo que siento por ti
9 Ya lo sé que tú te vas
10 Las puertas del olvido
11 Adiós por teléfono
Con Amor Hacia El 2000 (1999)
1 El Privilegio de Amar
2 Solo Importas Tú
3 
4 Si Me Dieras Tu Amor
5 La Suavecita
6 Se Busca
7 Año Viejo
8 Suavecito, Suavecito
9 Las Reumas
10 Por Cuanto Me Lo Das

References

Mexican musical groups